Lago di Lases is a lake in Trentino, Italy. At an elevation of 629 m, its surface area is 0.16 km².

Lakes of Trentino-Alto Adige/Südtirol